Neohecyra graueri is a species of beetle in the family Cerambycidae, and the only species in the genus Neohecyra. It was described by Hintz in 1916.

References

Crossotini
Beetles described in 1916
Monotypic beetle genera